"The Hundred Thousand Sons of Saint Louis" was the popular name for a French army mobilized in 1823 by the Bourbon King of France, Louis XVIII, to help the Spanish Royalists restore King Ferdinand VII of Spain to the absolute power of which he had been deprived during the Liberal Triennium. Despite the name, the actual number of troops was around 60,000.

The force comprised some five army corps (the bulk of the French regular army) and was led by the Duke of Angoulême, the son of the future King Charles X of France. The French name of the conflict is l'Expédition d'Espagne ("the Expedition of Spain").

Context

In 1822, Ferdinand VII applied the terms of the Congress of Vienna, lobbied for the assistance of the other absolute monarchs of Europe, in the process joining the Holy Alliance formed by Russia, Prussia, Austria and France to restore absolutism. In France, the ultra-royalists pressured Louis XVIII to intervene. To temper their counter-revolutionary ardor, the Duc de Richelieu deployed troops along the Pyrenees Mountains along the France-Spain border, charging them with halting the spread of Spanish liberalism and the "yellow fever" from encroaching into France. In September 1822 this  became an observation corps and then very quickly transformed itself into a military expedition.

France considers intervention

The Holy Alliance (Russia, Austria and Prussia) refused Ferdinand's request for help, but the Quintuple Alliance (Russia, Britain, France, Prussia and Austria) at the Congress of Verona in October 1822 gave France a mandate to intervene and restore the Spanish monarchy.   On 22 January 1823, a secret treaty was signed at the congress of Verona, allowing France to invade Spain to restore Ferdinand VII as an absolute monarch. With the agreement from the Holy Alliance, on 28 January 1823 Louis XVIII announced that "a hundred thousand Frenchmen are ready to march, invoking the name of Saint Louis, to safeguard the throne of Spain for a grandson of Henry IV of France". At the end of February, France's Chambres voted an extraordinary grant for the expedition. Chateaubriand and the ultra-royalists rejoiced; the royal army was going to prove its bravery and devotion in the face of Spanish liberals, fighting for the glory of the Bourbon monarchy.

The new prime minister, Joseph de Villèle, intended to oppose the war. The operation's cost was excessive, the army's organisation was defective and the troops' loyalty was uncertain.  The superintendent of the military was unable to assure logistic support for the expedition's 95,000 men (as counted at the end of March) concentrated in the Basses-Pyrénées and the Landes with 20,000 horses and 96 artillery pieces. To remedy his doubts, he had to consult the munitions-supplier Ouvrard, who quickly concluded that marches in Spain were as favourable to his own interests as to those of the army, even if they would be to the detriment of the public treasury.

French force

Command structure
The organisation of the expedition's command structure posed many problems.  Pro-Bourbon commanders had to be given the full chance to exercise the roles they had so recently been given by the Bourbon Restoration without compromising the army's loyalty or efficiency. The solutions was to give the secondary commands to former émigrés and Vendéens and the primary ones to former generals of the Revolution and First Empire. The Duke of Angoulême, whose father was Charles X, was made commander in chief of the Army of the Pyrénées despite his lack of military experience, but he agreed to hold it as a merely honorary role overseeing only the political direction of the expedition, leaving its military direction to Major-General Armand Charles Guilleminot, a tried-and-tested general of the First Empire.

Four of the five army corps were placed under generals who had fought for Napoleon – Marshal Nicolas Charles Oudinot, Duke of Reggio; General Gabriel Jean Joseph Molitor; Marshal Bon Adrien Jeannot de Moncey, Duke of Conegliano; and General Étienne Tardif de Pommeroux de Bordesoulle. The Prince of Hohenlohe commanded the Third Corps, the least-trusted of the five, with only two divisions and 16,000 (as opposed to the three or four divisions and 20 to 27 thousand men in the four other corps).

Loyalty
The expedition was made up of regiments in which many of the officers, NCOs and men had been marked by memories of the Napoleonic Wars and so were disposed more kindly towards the liberals than the French and Spanish Bourbons were. The liberals hoped to dissuade them from fighting "for monks, against liberty". Villèle was worried at their propaganda in bars and billets, and a song by Béranger spread throughout March and April inciting the soldiers to mutiny:

Course

Outbreak

On 6 April, the doubts of some and the illusions of others dispersed. On the banks of the Bidassoa, 500 liberal French and Piedmontese men faced off against the forward positions of the 9th Light Infantry Regiment. Brandishing a French Tricolour flag and singing La Marseillaise, they incited the soldiers not to cross the frontier. The King's infantrymen hesitated until General Louis Vallin rushed to them and ordered them to open fire. Several of the demonstrators were killed and the others dispersed. Many of them joined Englishmen under Colonel Robert Wilson, Belgians under Janssens and other French or Italian volunteers to form a liberal legion and a squadron of "liberty lancers" to fight beside the Spanish constitutional forces. The following day, on 7 April, the "100,000 Sons of Saint Louis" under the Duke of Angoulême entered Spain without opposition from the constitutional government's forces and with the support of the middle classes and part of the urban population.

French advance
In the north, Hohenlohe's 3rd Corps (reinforced in July by Lauriston's 5th Corps) forced General Morillo to retreat before rallying his troops. The French were left in control of the rural parts of Navarre, Asturias and Galicia; however, lacking siege equipment, they were unable to blockade the towns, where the liberals continued to resist for several more months. The city of A Coruña surrendered on 21 August, Pamplona on 16 September, and San Sebastián on 27 September. To the east and the southeast, Gabriel Jean Joseph Molitor pushed back General Francisco Ballesteros into Aragon, pursuing him as far as Murcia and Granada, winning an engagement at Campillo de Arenas on 28 July and forcing his surrender on 4 August. At Jaén, he defeated the final columns of Rafael Riego, who was captured by the Absolutists on 15 September and hanged in Madrid on 7 November, two days before the fall of Alicante. In Catalonia, Moncey managed to quell General Mina's regular and guerrilla forces, with Barcelona surrendering only on 2 November.

Andalusian front
More decisive operations spread across Andalusia, since it was the site of Cádiz, transformed into the Constitutionalists' provisional capital and thus the French force's main strategic objective. It contained the Cortes and the imprisoned king and was defended by a garrison of 14,000 men. At first Riego, then Generals Henry Joseph O'Donnell, Count of La Bisbal, Quiroga and Miguel de Álava led the action. Access to the city was protected by the batteries of Fort Santa Catalina and Fort San Sebastian to the west, Fort Santi-Pietri to the east and above all by the fortified peninsula of Trocadéro, where colonel Garcés positioned 1700 men and 50 guns.

Under the command of General Étienne Tardif de Pommeroux de Bordesoulle, soon joined by the Duke of Angoulême and Guilleminot, the infantry of generals Bourmont, Obert and Goujeon, the cavalry of Foissac-Latour, the artillery of Louis Tirlet and the engineers under Guillaume Dode de la Brunerie took up positions before Cádiz from mid-July. Forced to use several naval divisions for surveillance of Spain's Atlantic and Mediterranean ports and coasts (held by the Constitutionalists), the French navy was able to spare only a small squadron of 10 ships under Counter-Admiral Jacques Félix Emmanuel Hamelin to blockade the city. That proved too small a force for Hamelin to succeed in this mission and so on 27 August he was replaced by Counter-Admiral des Rotours, then by Duperré, who arrived only on 17 September, with meagre reinforcements.

Conclusion

On 31 August the French infantry assaulted Fuerte de Trocadero and at the cost of 35 killed and 110 wounded (as opposed to 150 dead, 300 wounded and 1,100 captured on the part of the garrison) successfully captured it, turning its powerful guns towards Cádiz. On 20 September, Fort Sancti-Petri fell in its turn in a combined army–navy operation. On 23 September, the guns of the Sancti-Petri and Trocadero forts and of Duperré's fleet bombarded the town and on 28 the constitutionalists adjudged the town lost. Thus, the Cortes decided to dissolve itself, give back absolute power to Ferdinand VII and hand him over to the French. On 30 September Cádiz surrendered and on 3 October more than 4,600 French troops landed at its port. The French army fired its last shots in Spain at the start of November. On 5 November, the Duke of Angoulême left Madrid and re-entered France on 23 November, leaving behind an occupying force of 45,000 men under the command of Bourmont. Spain was then progressively evacuated, but the French withdrawal was fully completed only in 1828.

Consequences
The liberals thus negotiated their return in exchange for Ferdinand's oath to respect the Spanish laws. However, on 1 October 1823, feeling bolstered by French forces, Ferdinand broke his oath and again repealed the Constitution of Cádiz and declared null and void all the acts and measures of the liberal government.

The war also seriously disturbed Spanish efforts to crush the independence struggles in Hispanic America. The last Spanish forces in mainland South America were defeated in the Battle of Ayacucho in 1824.

François-René de Chateaubriand, foreign minister in France's Villèle government (from 28 December 1822 to 6 June 1824), contrasted the expedition's success with France's failure in the Peninsular War:

Allusions
During the Spanish Civil War, the carabineros of Republican Spain were nicknamed "The Hundred Thousand Sons of Negrín".

Bibliography

In French
 , Paris, Volume 18, 2000
Larousse, tome 1, 2, 3, Paris, 1998
Caron, Jean-Claude, Paris, Armand Colin, coll. Cursus, 2004, 193 p.
Corvisier, André, tome 2, Paris, Presses universitaires de France, "Quadrige" collection, 1998, 627 p.
Demier, Francis, Seuil, 2000, 606 p.
Dulphy, Anne, Paris, Armand Colin, "128" collection, 2005, 127 p.
Duroselle, Jean-Baptiste, Paris, Presses Universitaires de France,  collection, 1967, 363 p.
Garrigues, Jean, Lacombrade, Philippe, Paris, Armand Colin, "Campus" collection, 2004, 191 p.
Lever, Evelyne, Louis XVIII, Paris, Fayard, 1998, 597 p.
Jean Sarrailh,  (Paris, 1930)

In Spanish
 Miguel Artola Gallego,  (Madrid, 1968)
 Jonathan Harris, "",  8 (1999), 9–29
W. Ramírez de Villa-Urrutia,  (Madrid, 1922)

In English
 Raymond Carr, Spain 1808–1975 (Oxford, 1982, 2nd ed.)
 Charles W. Fehrenbach, "Moderados and Exaltados: the liberal opposition to Ferdinand VII, 1814–1823", Hispanic American Historical Review 50 (1970), 52-69
 Jonathan Harris, "An English utilitarian looks at Spanish American independence: Jeremy Bentham's Rid Yourselves of Ultramaria", The Americas 53 (1996), 217-33
 Ralph Weaver, The Hundred Thousand Sons of St Louis. The French Campaign in Spain April to October 1823, Helion & Company Limited 2018, ISBN 978-1-912174-09-6.

See also
 Concert of Europe
 Congress of Verona
 Holy Alliance
 Ominous Decade
 Peninsular War

References

External links
http://www.onwar.com/aced/data/sierra/spain1820.htm
http://www.thefreedictionary.com/Spanish+Civil+War

Conflicts in 1822
Conflicts in 1823
1823 in Spain
1823 in France
Wars involving France
Wars involving Spain
Civil wars involving the states and peoples of Europe
Civil wars of the Industrial era
Bourbon Restoration
France–Spain military relations
Invasions of Spain
Revolutions during the 1820s